"General Secretary Xi Jinping's Kindness We Never Forget", is a song that praises Xi Jinping, the General Secretary of the Chinese Communist Party, which is composed by Li Changping.

The song was published in March 2019, before Lianghui. It became widespread on the internet among the Mainland Chinese community for a short time. It was subsequently removed from the Chinese internet.

See also
 "The Hopes of President Xi"

References

Xi Jinping
2019 songs
 Chinese songs